John Andreas Husøy (born 26 January 1983) is a Norwegian former footballer.

Career
He came to Molde FK as a youth player and played 17 league games in 2005. In the same season he scored the last goal in Molde's 4–2 victory against Lillestrøm in the 2005 Norwegian Football Cup Final.

In the 2006 season he moved to Moss FK, and became a regular here. In the 2008 season he moved to Sarpsborg 08 FF on loan, with no contract renewal. He instead played for Brattvåg IL, and later Åsane Fotball.

Honours
Molde FK
Norwegian Cup: 2005

References

1983 births
Living people
Sportspeople from Møre og Romsdal
Norwegian footballers
Molde FK players
Eliteserien players
Moss FK players
Sarpsborg 08 FF players
Åsane Fotball players
Association football midfielders